Braunstein's Building is a historic commercial building located at Wilmington, New Castle County, Delaware. It consists of two buildings built about 1900, and combined in 1924 as a single unit.  The building at 704 is a four-story, two bay brick commercial building and the buildings at 706 is a four-story, three bay brick commercial building.  It features a unifying first floor display window made of pressed metal, with accents of raised bands, panels with basket weave design, and stained glass in the Beaux Arts style.  The storefront was added in 1924.

It was added to the National Register of Historic Places in 1985.

References

Commercial buildings on the National Register of Historic Places in Delaware
Beaux-Arts architecture in Delaware
Commercial buildings completed in 1900
Buildings and structures in Wilmington, Delaware
National Register of Historic Places in Wilmington, Delaware